The 75th season of the Campeonato Gaúcho kicked off on February 17, 1995 and ended on August 13, 1995. Twenty-four teams participated. Grêmio beat holders Internacional in the finals and won their 30th title. Grêmio Bagé and Lajeadense were relegated.

Participating teams

System 
The championship would have five stages:

 Division A: The 14 best clubs in the previous year's championship played in a double round-robin format against the others in their group. The six best teams qualified to the Second phase, while the two teams with the fewest points in the sum of the rounds would dispute the Division B in 1996.
 Division B: The eight worst teams in the previous year joined the two teams that had been promoted from the Second level, and played each other in a double round-robin system. the best six teams qualified to the Second phase of that division, while the four worst teams would dispute the Relegation Playoffs. In the second phase, the remaining six teams would be divided into two groups of three, in which each team played the teams of its own group in a double round-robin system. The best team of each group would qualify to the Second phase of the championship, and to the Division A of the following year.
 Relegation Playoffs: The four teams that had qualified to this round played each other in a double round-robin format. The two teams with the fewest points were relegated.
 Second phase: The eight remaining teams were divided into two groups of four, in which each team played the teams of its own group in a double round-robin system. The two best teams in each group qualified to the Semifinals.
 Final phases: The four remaining teams played a series of two-legged knockout ties to define the champions.

Championship

Division A

Division B

Second phase

Group A

Group B

Relegation Playoffs

Second phase

Group 1

Group 2

Semifinals 

|}

Finals 

|}

References 

Campeonato Gaúcho seasons
Gaúcho